Herbert Cox may refer to:
 Sir Herbert Vaughan Cox (1860–1923), Indian Army general
 Sir Herbert Cox (judge) (1893–1973), British barrister and colonial judge
 Herb Cox (born 1950/51), Canadian politician